Funkstown Historic District is a national historic district at Funkstown, Washington County, Maryland, United States. The district includes 217 contributing buildings, one contributing structure, and three contributing sites.  The National Road forms Funkstown's main street and shaped in a significant way the appearance of the town. Funkstown's early and most extensive development was along this route, including the town's oldest known dwelling, the Jacob Funk House, built by the founder in 1769. Other properties are of sided log, stone, or brick construction of mixed residential and commercial use, dating from the late 18th century through the mid 20th century.

It was added to the National Register of Historic Places in 2000.

References

External links
, including photo from 1999, at Maryland Historical Trust
Boundary Map of the Funkstown Historic District, Washington County, at Maryland Historical Trust

Historic districts in Washington County, Maryland
Historic districts on the National Register of Historic Places in Maryland
National Register of Historic Places in Washington County, Maryland